Inverclyde East is one of the seven wards used to elect members of the Inverclyde Council. It elects three Councillors.

The ward includes the large village of Kilmacolm, the smaller settlement of Quarrier's Village, an elevated rural hinterland to the west (part of the Clyde Muirshiel Regional Park) and eastern parts of Port Glasgow (the Bardrainney, Broadfield, Park Farm and Woodhall neighbourhoods). In 2019, the ward had a population of 11,340.

Councillors

Election Results

2022 Election
2022 Inverclyde Council election

2017 Election
2017 Inverclyde Council election

2012 Election
2012 Inverclyde Council election

2007 Election
2007 Inverclyde Council election

References

Wards of Inverclyde
Port Glasgow